The following is a list of flags of Latvia.

National flag and State flag

Governmental standards

Military flags

Military pendants

Administrative divisions

Cities / State Cities

Towns and smaller settlements

Historical flags

Political flags

Ethnic groups flags

Proposed flags

House flags

See also

 National symbols of Latvia

References

 
Lists and galleries of flags
Flags